Sweet '17 Singles is the first compilation album and fifth overall album by American rock band Twin Peaks, released on February 9, 2018 on Grand Jury Music. It consists of 12 songs that were initially released across six 7" vinyl singles starting in July and ending in December, 2017. Each single was limited to 300 copies and sold by subscription. Due to popular demand, Twin Peaks compiled the songs and issued them on vinyl.

Track listing

Personnel 
Credits adapted from Sweet '17 Singles liner notes.

Twin Peaks

 Connor Brodner – drums 
 Colin Croom – lead vocals , guitars, keyboards
 Jack Dolan – bass guitar, lead vocals 
 Clay Frankel – lead vocals , guitars
 Cadien Lake James – lead vocals , guitars

Additional musicians

 Kevin Decker – saxophone, flute
Sima Cunningham – backing vocals 
 Marisa Nakamura – backing vocals 
Macie Stewart – backing vocals & violin 

Production

 Barrett Guzaldo – engineer
 R. Andrew Humphrey – engineer, mixer
 Alan Silverman – mastering
 Daniel Topete – cover photo
 Twin Peaks – recording

Charts

References 

Twin Peaks (band) albums
2018 compilation albums